Dominique Astrid Lévy (born June 1967) is a Swiss art dealer, and co-founder and partner, with Brett Gorvy, of Lévy Gorvy, a gallery with offices in New York City, London, Switzerland, Hong Kong and Paris.

Early life 
Lévy was born in June 1967, in Lausanne, Switzerland. Her father, a cotton merchant, left Egypt in 1956 after Gamal Abdel Nasser came to power. She organized her first exhibition when she was 18. Lévy studied art history and politics at the University of Geneva and received a BA in Political Science and an MA in Sociology of Art.

Career
In 1987, Lévy completed her first internship for Christie's in New York. When she came back to Switzerland, she was hired by Simon de Pury to work at Sotheby's where she worked for four years. Afterwards, she worked with French art dealer Daniel Malingue on the opening of his gallery, and followed his co-director, Simon Studer, in the creation of an art curation business. Then she joined the team of London's art dealer Anthony d'Offay. In 1999, headhunted by François Pinault, Lévy founded and was the international director of the private sales department at Christie's in New York.

In 2003, Lévy founded Dominique Lévy Fine Art, a boutique art advisory service with a focus on building long-term relationships with collectors.

L&M Arts, 2005–2013
In August 2005, Lévy co-founded L&M Arts with Robert Mnuchin, which was based in New York and Los Angeles. The bi-coastal gallery provided client services and organized exhibitions of modern and postwar art, as well as new work by such artists as David Hammons and Paul McCarthy.

Dominique Lévy Gallery, 2013-2017
In September 2013, Dominique Lévy Gallery opened its Manhattan space with the exhibition Audible Presence: Lucio Fontana, Yves Klein, Cy Twombly, which was accompanied by the first public performance in New York of Yves Klein's seminal Monotone Silence Symphony.

In October 2014, Dominique Lévy expanded to London, opening a location at historic 22 Old Bond Street, close to the Royal Academy of Arts in the city's Mayfair district. She co curated an exhibition of Pierre Soulages in New York in collaboration with Emmanuel Perrotin.

In 2015, her galleries exhibited Gerhard Richter's color charts, miniatures of Alexander Calder, Gego's work

Lévy Gorvy, 2017–2021
In 2017, Lévy partnered with art dealer Brett Gorvy, former chairman and international head of post-war and contemporary art at Christie's and they co-founded Levy Gorvy with spaces in New York, London and Hong Kong. In 2020, the gallery added a Paris space.

In 2019, for the 100th birthday of Pierre Soulages, Lévy Gorvy notably organized an exhibition ahead of his retrospective at the Musee du Louvre. The gallery currently represents the estates of Yves Klein, Roman Opalka, Germaine Richier and Carol Rama (since 2016) in the United States, as well as artists Enrico Castellani, Boris Mikhailov, Frank Stella, Pierre Soulages, and Günther Uecker. From 2017 until 2020, it also worked with the estate of François Morellet.

LGDR
In August 2021, Lévy Gorvy announced plans to join forces with Jeanne Greenberg Rohatyn and Amalia Dayan.

Recognition
 2014: Movers and makers: the most powerful people in the art world, by The Guardian
 2013: Women in art, by Elle Magazine
 2012: 10 most influential art dealers, by Forbes

References

External links
 Official website
 Lévy Gorvy Gallery

1967 births
Living people
Swiss art dealers
People from Lausanne
University of Geneva alumni
20th-century Swiss businesswomen
20th-century Swiss businesspeople
21st-century Swiss businesswomen
21st-century Swiss businesspeople